Abhirami Venkatachalam (9 March 1991) is an Indian actress who works prominently in Tamil film industry. She appeared in the first season of the spin-off version of Bigg Boss Tamil called Bigg Boss Ultimate (season 1) and emerged as the 5th runner up.

Acting career
Abhirami Iyer started her career as a model and won the  Miss Tamil Nadu title. In 2016, she starred in the web series Ctrl Alt Delete. The following year, she hosted the reality show Star Wars on Sun TV. Abhirami made her acting debut in Anand Shankar's NOTA (2018), portraying the love interest of the characters portrayed by senior actors Nassar and Sathyaraj. She then appeared Kalavu and portrayed one of the leads in the film. That same year, she participated in the third season of the reality show Bigg Boss Tamil. After auditioning for several films including  Kaatru Veliyidai and Vikram Vedha, she landed a role in Nerkonda Paarvai (2019). In a review of the film by The Week, the critic noted that "Abhirami is at her best when she shouts and cries in the courtroom". She starred in the web series Iru Dhruvam in 2019 with Nandha. She had also auditioned for the lead heroine in Dhruva Natchathiram before she was signed to portray a supporting role. She has also signed the Malaysian Tamil film titled Gajen and an untitled film with Aari Arjuna.

Filmography 
All films are in Tamil, unless otherwise noted.

Web series, Short Films & Music Video

Television

References

External links 

Indian film actresses
Living people
Actresses in Tamil cinema
Indian female models
21st-century Indian actresses
Bigg Boss (Tamil TV series) contestants
1991 births